Acinocheirodon melanogramma is a species of characin endemic to Brazil, where it is found in the São Francisco and Jequitinhonha Rivers. It is the only member of its genus.  It can be found in freshwater environments at a benthopelagic depth range.  They are native to a tropical climate. The average length of an unsexed male is about 3.8 cm (about 3.0 in). They are distributed in the São Francisco and Jequitinhonha River basins of Brazil. This species prefer to live in fresh water with a moderate current. They have one row of teeth in the upper and lower jaw. The common names of A. melanogramma in Brazil are pequira, piabinha, and lambari.

References

Characidae
Fish of the São Francisco River basin
Endemic fauna of Brazil
Fish described in 1999
Monotypic ray-finned fish genera